SKW may refer to:

Transportation

Airlines
SkyWest Airlines (US Airline)
Skwentna Airport (IATA: SKW), Alaska, U.S.

Rail
Shau Kei Wan station (station code SKW), Hong Kong
Stoke Newington railway station (station code SKW), London, U.K.
Sheikhupur railway station (station code SKW), Uttar Pradesh, India

Other uses
Military Counterintelligence Service (Poland) (Polish: Służba Kontrwywiadu Wojskowego)
SK Windhoek, Namibian sports club
SKW (group), an American girl group formed in 2001
South Korean Won